The following is a list of Comorian politicians, both past and present.



A
Abdallah, Ahmed
Abdou, Ahmed
Abdoulwahab, Mohamed
Ahmed, Mohamed
Ali, Said Ibrahim Ben
Ali, Salim Ben
Assoumani, Azali
Atthoumani, Said
Attoumane, Ahmed Ben Cheikh
Ayouba, Combo

B
Bacar, Mohamed
Bourhane, Nourdine

C
Chebani, Haribon
Cheikh, Said Mohamed

D
Djohar, Said Mohamed
Djoussouf, Abbas

E
El-Yachourtu, Caabi
Elamine, Soeuf Mohamed
Elbak, Abdou Soule

F
Fazul, Mohamed Said

H
Halidi, Dhoihirou
Halidi, Ibrahim Abderamane
Hamadi, Hassane
Houmadi, Halifa
Houmadi, Kaambi

J
Jaffar, Said Mohamed

K
Kafe, Said
Kemal, Said Ali

L
Larifou, Said

M
Madi, Hamada
Madi, Mohamed Abdou
Maecha, Mtara
Massounde, Tadjidine Ben Said
Mohamed, Abdallah
Mradabi, Mahamoud
Mroudjae, Ali

S
Said, Mohamed Ali
Soefou, Aboudou
Soilih, Ali

T
Taki, Mohamed
Tarmidi, Bianrifi

 
Comoros, politicians
Politicians